The 2014 IPC Shooting World Championships was an international shooting competition for athletes with a disability. It consisted of twelve events and was held at the Schießsportzentrum in Suhl, Germany from 18 to 26 July. The Championships were contested by 265 competitors from 53 nations, with South Korea finishing top of the medal table with most gold medals (10) and medals won (17). During the qualification and finals, nine world records were equaled or broken and multiple regional records were set.

The 2014 Championship was a qualifying event for the 2016 Summer Paralympics in Rio, Brazil. It was the first individual sport to assign competitors to the 2016 Games with 28 countries winning a total of 63 spots. South Korea were the most successful nation, claiming 11 places while China, Norway, Russia and Ukraine took four a-piece. 

This proved to be the final event branded as the "IPC Shooting World Championships". On 30 November 2016, the IPC, which serves as the international federation for 10 disability sports, including shooting, adopted the "World Para" brand for all 10 sports. The world championship events in all of these sports were immediately rebranded as "World Para" championships. At the same time, the IPC changed the official name of the sport to "shooting Para sport". Accordingly, future IPC shooting championships are known as "World Shooting Para Sport Championships".

Classification
Paralympic shooters were classified according to the extent of their disability. The classification system allowed shooters to compete against others with a similar level of function.

Shooting classifications are:
SH1 - competitors who do not need a shooting stand
SH2 - competitors who use a shooting stand to support the firearm's weight

World records
At the championships eight new world records were set and one was equaled.

Medal summary

Medal table
This ranking sorts countries by the number of gold medals earned by their shooters (in this context a nation is an entity represented by a National Paralympic Committee). The number of silver medals is taken into consideration next and then the number of bronze medals. If, after the above, countries are still tied, equal ranking is given and they are listed alphabetically.

Medalists

Pistol

Men's

Women's

Mixed

Rifle

Men's

Women's

Mixed

Participating nations
Below is the list of countries who took part in the 2014 Shooting World Championships and in brackets behind are the number of competitors each country sent.

 (1)
 (20)
 (15)
 (13)
 (31)
 (2)
 (5)
 (26)
 (9)
 (14)
 (1)
 (2)
 (10)
 (1)
 (6)
 (16)
 (47)
 (11)
 (34)
 (3)
 (8)
 (6)
 (11)
 (5)
 (2)
 (25)
 (5)
 (2)
 (2)
 (1)
 (5)
 (12)
 (2)
 (7) 
 (19)
 (22)
 (2)
 (37)
 (1)
 (29)
 (20) 
 (14)
 (2)
 (40)
 (4)
 (30) 
 (3)
 (31)
 (43)
 (15)
 (24)
 (1)
 (1)

References

External links
Official Site of the 2014 IPC Shooting World Championships

World Shooting Para Sport Championships
Paralympics
Shooting competitions in Germany
International sports competitions hosted by Germany
2014 in German sport